The Wallis and Futuna national football team is the national soccer team of Wallis and Futuna. Wallis and Futuna is not a member of FIFA and, therefore, is not eligible to enter either the FIFA World Cup or the OFC Nations Cup, and due to the low investment in sport on the part of the country, it has been many years since it played an international match.

Wallis and Futuna has played twenty-four international matches, all at the South Pacific Games between 1966 and 1995, and holds an overall record of five wins and nineteen defeats.

History

Beginnings 
In 1966, there was an initiative for the small country to play in the South Pacific Games that year. The proposal was carried out and Wallis and Futuna entered the group stage, losing 5–0 to Tahiti and 9–1 to Papua New Guinea.

They achieved their best results at the 1979 South Pacific Games, qualifying to the knock-out stages with a 3–1 victory over Western Samoa after losing to Solomon Islands 6–0. They lost their quarter-final match against Fiji 5–0 which qualified them for the Consolation Tournament, where they were eliminated by Tonga 1–0. At the 1983 South Pacific Games, they lost their first group match 3–0 against American Samoa but a 2–1 victory over Western Samoa and a 3–0 win against Tonga meant that they topped their group. In the quarter-finals they lost 4–0 to New Caledonia, eliminating them from the competition.

Decline
The 1987 South Pacific Games was played as a round-robin, resulting in four defeats for Wallis and Futuna, with their only victory coming against American Samoa 5–1. At the 1991 South Pacific Games they lost in each of their group stage matches and were defeated by Tahiti in the Consolation Tournament, qualifying them for the seventh-place playoff where they beat Guam 5–0.

Inactivity 
The last time Wallis and Futuna played a game was in 1995. In this edition, the team lost all 4 games it played. Since then it has been completely inactive.

Fixtures and results

Competitive record

Pacific Games

Head-to-head record

References

External links
  Wallis and Futuna match history
 World Football Elo Ratings

 
Oceanian national association football teams
National football teams of Overseas France
Football in Wallis and Futuna